The Wonder is the sixth studio album by rock artist Tom Verlaine. It was released in 1990 on Fontana Records. The album was engineered by Mario Salvati and mixed by Tom Verlaine and Fred Smith except side 1 tracks 1, 2, 4, 5 and side 2 track 1 mixed by Julian Mendelsohn.

Recording
Recorded after a three year break, The Wonder featured Verlaine using a more affected singing style, described by Allmusic’s David Cleary as "an oily manner...suggesting a smarmy Bryan Ferry" (Ferry was the lead singer of Roxy Music). Verlaine also used the guitarist of The Church Marty Willson-Piper uncredited to fill out the guitar sound on the album. Willson-Piper recalls playing on "Stalingrad" with Jay Dee Daugherty, who also wasn't credited.

Track listing
All songs written by Tom Verlaine

Side one
 "Kaleidescopin'" - 3:27
 "August" - 5:22
 "Ancient Egypt" - 4:32
 "Shimmer" - 3:36
 "Stalingrad" - 3:25

Side two
 "Pillow" - 4:27
 "Storm" - 2:37
 "5 Hours from Calais" - 4:35
 "Cooleridge" - 4:17
 "Prayer" - 3:55

Personnel
Tom Verlaine - guitars, solos and vocals
Jimmy Ripp - guitars
Fred Smith - bass
Andy Newmark - drums
Bruce Brody - keyboards
Technical
Mario Salvati - engineer

References

External links

1990 albums
Tom Verlaine albums
Fontana Records albums